Maqsud Beyk (also Romanized as Maqşūd Beyk; also known as Magşūd Beyk and Maqsūd Begi) is a village in Manzariyeh Rural District, in the Central District of Shahreza County, Isfahan Province, Iran. At the 2006 census, its population was 139, in 46 families.

References 

Populated places in Shahreza County